The klemheist knot or French Machard knot is a type of friction hitch that grips the rope when weight is applied, and is free to move when the weight is released. It is used similarly to a Prusik knot or the Bachmann knot to ascend or descend a climbing rope. One advantage is that webbing can be used as an alternative to cord. The Klemheist is easier to slide up than a Prusik. The klemheist is also a way to attach a snubber to the anchor rope of small boats, with the advantage that it is easy to undo.

Sometimes the knot name is misspelled as kleimheist, with an extra i.

Technique 

Make a  secure loop of a cord (see Double fisherman's knot) that is definitely narrower than the rope. Wrap from one end around the rope two or three times in a direction that will be down. The loose end is then threaded through the starting end, and carefully tightened to leave the wraps neat. In use, strain must be taken only on the hanging end. If the knot slips when load is placed on the hanging loop, re-tie around the climbing rope another time or two, until there is no slippage. Holding around the wraps will let you slide the knot up or down.  Making the wraps slide when the hitch is under tension will create friction heat on the rope and the knot.

See also
List of knots
List of friction hitch knots

References

External links 

Chockstone: Friction Knots
Mark Adams's "Son of a Hitch: A Genealogy of Arborists’ Climbing Hitches"
A scientific study of common friction knots

Climbing knots